The Cuanza vlei rat (Otomys cuanzensis) is a species of rodent in the family Muridae.
It is found only in Angola.
Its natural habitats are subtropical or tropical high-altitude grassland and swampland.

References

Endemic fauna of Angola
Otomys
Mammals described in 1937
Taxonomy articles created by Polbot